The Haxhi Ymer Kuttab is a cultural heritage monument in Gjakova, Kosovo.

History
The Haxhi Ymer Kuttab is located opposite the entrance to Haxhi Ymer Mosque in the eponymous complex and neighborhood. Mainly dedicated to Muslim religious education, it also housed a printing press and secondary school classes in the 1990s. 

The mejtep is a two-story stone and adobe building marred over the years by restoration issues such as widened windows for floor light. The mezzanine is wooden with boarded floors and ceiling decoration. The western veranda on the street has also seen better days. Except for the ground floor skylights due for later, the structure was restored faithfully in 2014.

References

Historic sites in Kosovo
18th-century religious buildings and structures